Frederick L. Wampler (October 17, 1923 – April 27, 1985) was an American professional golfer who played on the PGA Tour and the Senior PGA Tour.

Wampler was born in Bedford, Indiana. He played on the Purdue University golf team from 1948 to 1950. In 1950, he won the NCAA individual championship, was selected as Purdue's first All-American and won the Big Ten individual title for the third consecutive year. Wampler still shares the Big Ten tournament record for lowest individual round with a 64 in the fourth round of the 1950 Big Ten Championships.

A veteran of World War II, Wampler served in the United States Navy in the Pacific prior to enrolling at Purdue University.

Wampler's only PGA Tour win came at the 1954 Los Angeles Open. He finished runner-up to Sam Snead in the 1956 Greater Greensboro Open on the second hole of a sudden death playoff. Like most golfers of his generation, he earned his living primarily as a club professional. Starting in 1965, he served 17 years as the head pro at Denver Country Club.

On the Senior PGA Tour, Wampler finished runner-up twice in the Senior PGA Championship. In 1975, he lost on the first playoff hole to Charlie Sifford and in 1976, he finished five strokes behind Pete Cooper.

Wampler was inducted into the Indiana Golf Hall of Fame in 1972, the Purdue University Sports Hall of Fame and the Colorado Golf Hall of Fame in 1997.

Wampler died at the age of 61 after an 18-year battle with chronic leukemia.

Amateur wins
1947 Indiana Amateur
1948 Big-10 Championship
1949 Indiana Amateur, Big-10 Championship
1950 Big-10 Championship, NCAA Championship

Professional wins (10)

PGA Tour wins (1)

PGA Tour playoff record (0–1)

Other wins (9)
This list may be incomplete
1950 Indiana Open (as an amateur)
1952 Long Island Open
1953 Manchester Open
1962 St. Clair Open
1966 Colorado PGA Championship
1968 Colorado PGA Championship
1973 Colorado PGA Championship
1974 Colorado PGA Championship
1983 Indiana Senior Open

References

External links

American male golfers
Purdue Boilermakers men's golfers
PGA Tour golfers
PGA Tour Champions golfers
Golfers from Indiana
United States Navy personnel of World War II
People from Bedford, Indiana
1923 births
1985 deaths